Iriel may refer to:

Íriel Fáid, a legendary High King of Ireland
Iriel (Dune), a minor character in the novel Hunters of Dune